LETM1 domain-containing protein 1 is a protein that in humans is encoded by the LETMD1 gene.

References

Further reading